Frederic Pepoon Olcott (February 23, 1841, in Albany, Albany County, New York – April 15, 1909, in Bernardsville, Somerset County, New Jersey) was an American banker and politician.

Early life
Olcott was born on February 23, 1841, in Albany, New York. He was the eleventh and last child of Thomas Worth Olcott (1795–1880) and Caroline Dwight ( Pepoon) Olcott (1797–1867). His father, as well as his elder brother Dudley, served as President of the Mechanics' and Farmers' and the Mechanics' and Farmers' Savings Bank of Albany.

He was educated at The Albany Academy, and then began working at his father's bank. After leaving the bank, he joined the lumber firm of Bissell, Fassett & Co.

Career
In 1866, he relocated to New York City and became a stockbroker in Wall Street.

On January 1, 1877, he was appointed New York State Comptroller to serve for the remainder of the unexpired term of Lucius Robinson who had been elected Governor. At the New York state election, 1877, he was elected on the Democratic, German-American Independent and Bread-Winners' League tickets to succeed himself, and remained in office until the end of 1879. He was defeated for re-election at the New York state election, 1879.

From 1884 to 1905, he was President of the Central Trust Company of New York, which after mergers and acquisitions found its way into the JPMorgan Chase company. In this capacity he was involved in the re-organization of many railroads in financial trouble, like the Philadelphia and Reading Railroad, the Brooklyn Elevated Railroad, the Third Avenue Railroad, and the Toledo, St. Louis and Kansas City Railroad. He also was a director of the Delaware, Lackawanna and Western Railroad.

In 1896, because of his opposition to William Jennings Bryan whom he accused of trying to destroy the American economy, he became a Republican and was a delegate from New Jersey to the 1900 Republican National Convention.

Personal life
Olcott was married to Mary Esmay, a daughter of Isaac Esmay and Eliza ( Angus) Esmay. Together, they had two children, a son and a daughter:

 Edith Olcott (1870–1953), who married Barend van Gerbig.
 Dudley Olcott II (1874–1946), who married Sarah Lewis ( Crozer) Howard in 1903. They divorced in 1932 and he married Leontine "Leo" Marie Berry (1883–1981). His first wife later married Prince Basil Narischkine.

After suffering from heart trouble and chronic Bright's disease, he died at his farm in Bernardsville, New Jersey. He was buried at Albany Rural Cemetery, Section 53, Lot 12.

Descendants
Through his daughter Edith, he was a grandfather of Howell van Gerbig (1902–1965), who married four times, including to Geraldine Livingston Thompson and Dorothy Randolph Fell, and was the mother of Howell John "Mickey" van Gerbig (1941–2006), and Barend "Barry" van Gerbig (b. 1939), best known as the owner of the NHL's California Seals.

Through his son Dudley, he was a grandfather of Jeanne "Jean" Grubb Olcott, who married George M. Owens, and Gladys Grubb Olcott (1904–1978), who married French soldier and diplomat, Jean de Pendril Waddington, in 1922. They divorced in 1932, and she married Count Josef Graf von Ledebur-Wicheln a month later. They also divorced.

References
Notes

Sources

External links
 
The Central Trust at www.smokershistory.com The Central Trust, Banking history

1841 births
1909 deaths
New York (state) Democrats
New York State Comptrollers
New Jersey Republicans
American bankers
Stockbrokers
Politicians from Albany, New York
People from Bernardsville, New Jersey
Burials at Albany Rural Cemetery
19th-century American railroad executives
Businesspeople from Albany, New York
The Albany Academy alumni